Iceman (Robert Louis "Bobby" Drake) is a superhero appearing in American comic books published by Marvel Comics and is a founding member of the X-Men. Created by writer Stan Lee and artist/co-plotter Jack Kirby, the character first appeared in The X-Men #1 (Sept. 1963). Iceman is a mutant born with superhuman abilities. He has the ability to manipulate ice and cold by freezing water vapor around him. This allows him to freeze objects, as well as cover his body with  ice.

Iceman has a relatively high profile among X-Men characters due to being frequently adapted into X-Men and Spider-Man-related media, including video games, animated series, and films. The character later received widespread media attention when a storyline revealed that the character was a closeted gay man in All-New X-Men #40 (April 2015), leading to his coming out.

Iceman has been described as one of the most notable and powerful gay characters in comic books.

From 2000 to 2014, Shawn Ashmore portrayed Iceman in the 20th Century Fox X-Men films and voiced the character in The Super Hero Squad Show.

Publication history
Created by writer Stan Lee and artist/co-writer Jack Kirby, the character first appeared in X-Men #1 (September 1963). Lee later admitted that Iceman was created essentially as a copy of the Human Torch, only using the opposite element for his power.

Iceman was featured in two self-titled limited comic book miniseries, one in 1984–85 written by J. M. DeMatteis and another in the 2000s by Andy Lanning and Dan Abnett, with art by Karl Kerschl. DeMatteis said of the first series, "It was my idea, so there was no one to blame but myself. I'll just say that it was a mistake and if the series made any sense whatsoever it was due to [editor] Bob Budiansky. That was a case where the editor's input was really needed—and Bob was a big help."

A mainstay in most X-Men titles, Iceman has been a main character in both Uncanny X-Men and the second volume of X-Men and was also featured in The Champions from 1975 to 1978 and The New Defenders from 1983 to 1986 as a member. He was a main character in the first volume of X-Factor, and a star in flashback stories when he was a teenager in X-Men: The Hidden Years and X-Men: First Class.

In April 2015, in issue 40 of All-New X-Men, a time-displaced version of the teenaged Iceman was revealed as gay by his teammate, Jean Grey, who discerned this with her telepathic ability. This raised questions, because the character's adult, present-day counterpart had previously been portrayed dating women. In Uncanny X-Men #600, which was published in November that year, the young Iceman confronts his older self, who confirms that he is gay as well but repressed his true self, not wanting to be both gay and a mutant. In 2017, Iceman received his first ongoing solo series, which focused on the adult Bobby Drake coming to terms with life as an out gay man, his Omega-level superpowers, his legacy as a hero and fighting some of the biggest villains in the Marvel Universe. The book had been cancelled, with its last issue being in early 2018. However, Marvel later reversed the decision and announced that a new book written by original writer Sina Grace as a part of their Fresh Start initiative and was released in 2019.

Fictional character biography

Early life
Robert Louis "Bobby" Drake was born in Floral Park, Long Island, New York, to William Robert Drake and Madeline Beatrice Bass-Drake. His father is Irish-American Catholic, and his mother is Jewish. Bobby's powers first manifested when he was on a date with Judy Harmon, and a local bully by the name of Rocky Beasely tried to take Judy away for himself. Knowing Judy could not put up a good fight, Bobby pointed his hand at Beasely and encased him in a block of ice. Later, the local townspeople, having heard of the incident, came looking for him in the form of an angry mob. The local sheriff had no choice but to put Bobby in jail for his own "protection". While Bobby sat in his cell at the sheriff station, the outer wall was blown open, and a young man named Scott Summers walked in and offered to take Bobby with him. After Bobby turned him down, the two mutants got into a short battle, which was soon ended by the arrival of Professor Charles Xavier.

After Xavier spoke with Bobby and his parents, Bobby's parents suggested that he go with Professor Xavier to his "school for gifted youngsters". Bobby took the suggestion and left with Professor Xavier and Cyclops to become the second member of the X-Men. He is later joined by Henry "Hank" McCoy, Jean Grey, and Warren Worthington III as the founding members of the X-Men. Drake remains self-conscious regarding the fact that he is the youngest member of the group. Appearing in his original snow covered form, he first battles Magneto along with the rest of the team, and later the Brotherhood of Evil Mutants. Bobby Drake's first girlfriend is Zelda. Not long after, he takes on a new ice-covered form. He then teams up with the Human Torch for the first time. The two would become close friends as time went on. With the X-Men, he visits the Savage Land and meets Ka-Zar for the first time. He then battles the Juggernaut, and is badly injured in his first battle against the Sentinels. He next battles Magneto by himself. Later, he visits Subterranea for the first time. Then, he and Beast battle the Maha Yogi. During his original stint with the X-Men, Drake pursues a relationship with Lorna Dane, although the relationship does not last. Iceman is among the original X-Men captured by Krakoa, leading to a new incarnation of X-Men of which he is not a member. With most of the original team, he quits the X-Men.

Champions and Defenders
Iceman moves to the American west coast to attend UCLA and becomes a founding member of The Champions of Los Angeles. However, the Champions soon dissolve.

Iceman is then abducted by Master Mold, and alongside Angel, he encounters the Hulk. Iceman next aids the Thing in battling the Circus of Crime. Drake retires from life as a superhero to earn a college degree in accounting – but apparently at a college on the east coast, not UCLA. While in college, he briefly rejoins the X-Men to rescue the captives of Arcade's henchman, Miss Locke.

Iceman is reunited with Beast, encounters Cloud, and then returns as a full-time superhero in an incarnation of the Defenders alongside his former teammates, Angel and Beast. He also battles Professor Power's Secret Empire while with the Defenders. After the Defenders disband, Drake embarks on his career as an accountant.

Some time later, Iceman encounters Mirage, the "daughter" of Oblivion. Iceman journeys back in time and meets his parents before he was born, and battles Oblivion and Mirage. He then reconciles with his parents.

X-Factor
The original X-Men, including Iceman, reunite to form the superhero team X-Factor. With this new team, he encounters Apocalypse for the first time.

During his time with the team, Loki captures Bobby, hoping to use him to gain control over the Frost Giants. Loki enhances Bobby's powers and then extracts them to restore the size of the Frost Giants. Iceman is rescued by Thor. Loki's tampering increases Bobby's powers to such an extent that he begins to lose control of his abilities. During a later battle with the Right, he is fitted with a power-dampening belt which actually helps him control his abilities. Once able only to sheathe his own body in a protective coating of ice, Bobby finds he can encase the entirety of the Empire State Building. With time, Bobby gains sufficient control over his augmented powers and is able to stop using the inhibitor belt. Believing he has achieved his full potential, Bobby does not attempt to develop his abilities further.

With X-Factor, Bobby then defeats Apocalypse's Horsemen. Iceman helps watch over many of the younger superheroes, something he once was. Most notably, he and Beast help Boom Boom gain a more normal life. For a brief while, he also helps supervise the New Mutants and their sister team, the X-Terminators. They, in turn, save him from the deadly kiss of Infectia.

Bobby also develops a romantic relationship with Opal Tanaka. After a session of ice sledding, she discovers threatening mail in her mailbox, a precursor to harassment by her cybernetically enhanced relatives of the Tatsu Clan of the Yakuza, which Bobby helps her out with.

After the "Muir Island Saga", Iceman rejoins the X-Men along with the rest of X-Factor.

Back with the X-Men
When he rejoined the X-Men it seemed that he learned to control his powers and no longer needed the inhibitor belt, this made him believe he reached the limit of his powers. The X-Men were separated into two groups, Iceman was placed in the gold team, led by Storm, along with fellow original X-Men Jean Grey (now without a code name) and Archangel.

One day he took Opal to eat with his parents, however his dad began humiliating her because of her Japanese heritage. The four are attacked by the Cyber-Samurai, which added to William Drake's prejudices about the girl. When Bobby came across Mikhail Rasputin he used his mutant abilities on him. Bobby discovered that his potential was still far from being reached as he converted his body into ice, not just covered by it. By turning his entire body to ice, instead of just wearing an icy exterior, Bobby now was capable of using his power in new, aggressive ways, adding spikes and padding to his ice structure.

Too busy with the many threats that the X-Men faced every day, Bobby let his relationship with Opal deteriorate and, when they finally saw each other again after weeks, it was only to save her from an attack by mutant haters. Annoyed that she could only gain his attention by nearly getting killed, Opal broke off their relationship.

Later, as he was checking on Emma Frost who was in a comatose state after the mutant Trevor Fitzroy unleashed the mutant-hunting Sentinels on Emma Frost and her students known as the Hellions, the mansion was hit by an electricity breakdown. Emma woke up disoriented, possessed Bobby's mind, and used his powers in ways Bobby never had; she froze an entire river and traveled through water. She was looking for her pupils but after finding out they were dead, she left Bobby's body.

Bobby invites Rogue to tag along on a visit to his parents. Wrongly assuming a romantic relation, his father disapproves of Rogue, verbally attacking them with the same prejudices he expressed with Opal. This time, Bobby had enough and left after telling his father that he should just accept the fact that he is a mutant and he would never fit the definition he has of normal. He was upset that Emma exhibited greater control of his powers than he had. Since Rogue was having problems with Gambit, the two of them go on a road trip to ease their minds.

During the Legion Quest, Iceman was one of the X-Men who went back in time to stop Legion from killing Magneto. They succeed, but only partially. Legion does not kill Magneto, but instead accidentally murdered Xavier, his own father, years before Legion had been conceived much less born. This paradox caused the events of the Age of Apocalypse. At the last moment before the original reality ended, Iceman's fellow X-Men, Rogue and Gambit shared a kiss. When reality resumed, Rogue's mind-absorbing touch renders Gambit comatose. Having absorbed some secret haunting memories, she needs to get away from the X-Men and Iceman volunteers to join her on a road trip, though at the same time he was starting to see visions of Emma Frost. When Gambit awoke from his coma, he tracked them down and confronted Rogue about what she saw in his mind. She broke off their relationship, Iceman and Gambit returned to the X-Men.

When the entity known as Onslaught first appeared, Iceman was chosen as one of his test subjects, along with Storm, Cyclops and Wolverine. They were pitted against a servant of Onslaught named Post, in a specific battle area of harsh environment to test the extent of their abilities. They won and were returned to the mansion. However, Iceman's chest had been shattered in his ice form during battle, making it impossible to change back to human form. He confronted Emma Frost and demanded to know what she did to his powers in his body and how to save himself. She refused to help since she knew that Bobby would have to do it himself. When he captured her with his ice powers, she telepathically showed him his insecurities. By confronting Opal and his father in her simulation, Iceman realized that Emma was right and managed to transform back to his human body with his chest fully intact.

When Graydon Creed was running for President (with a heavy anti mutant campaign), Bobby was chosen to infiltrate in the campaign. His father stood out in a crowd and spoke in favor of the mutants, which came as a surprise to Bobby. His father's connection with Bobby was discovered, so the people that worked for Graydon captured him and almost beat him to death. Bobby decided to stay away from the X-Men for a while to be with his dad.

Zero Tolerance came across and Bobby found and helped Cecilia Reyes who was trying to keep a secret that she was a mutant. They also joined with Charlotte Jones and the Morlock Marrow. After Bastion was defeated, he took Cecilia and Marrow to the mansion, and soon left the X-Men again for a while to be with his parents.

Much later, the X-Men found evidence in one of Destiny's journals of a group known as the Twelve, including Xavier, Magneto, Cyclops, Phoenix, Iceman, Polaris, Storm, Cable, Bishop, Sunfire, Mikhail Rasputin and the Living Monolith. They also learned that the Apocalypse's Horsemen had been kidnapping these mutants from around the globe. Iceman was captured in the woods near his home by Deathbird, who had become the Horseman War. Gathering the remaining Twelve, the X-Men traveled to Egypt and confronted Apocalypse and the Skrulls. Apocalypse and his forces captured all of the Twelve during the battle, using them in a ritual to give the Chaos-Bringer a new body and incredible power. Magneto and Polaris created opposite magnetic polarities, Iceman, Storm, and Sunfire provided elemental extremes, Cyclops, Phoenix, and Cable gave the sheer power of family, Xavier represented the power of mind and Bishop and Mikhail stood for time and space, while the Monolith linked all their energies together. Nate Grey was to be Apocalypse's new host, a powerhouse to store his massive lifeforce. The Twelve managed to free themselves and Cyclops sacrificed his own body and life force to keep Apocalypse from getting Nate. Though the new Apocalypse was defeated, Cyclops seemed lost forever.

After that incident, Iceman helped the Beast to secretly enter Genosha, as he wanted to study the legacy-infected mutates. When the High Evolutionary released his anti-mutation wave, they were trapped in the war-ravaged country. With the aid of Magneto, they escaped and joined forces with the rest of the scattered X-Men. They raided the Evolutionary's satellite, disabled the mutation field and defeated Sinister, who had been manipulating the Evolutionary.

Iceman was recruited by the living ship Prosh, along with other mutants, like Jean Grey, Mystique, Toad and Juggernaut, to preserve evolution and save it. In this journey Iceman developed his powers even further, which led him to no longer be afraid of the natural course of his powers and he returned to the X-Men. He joined a new team of X-Men, consisting of Angel, Nightcrawler, Wolverine and Chamber. He was using his abilities in a whole new way now, just channelling the power and not turning his body into ice.

Second mutation

During a heated battle with a recently evolved Black Tom Cassidy, he received a chest wound. After returning to normal his chest did not fully recover and some parts of it remained icy, and he was unable to return them to normal. At first he became afraid of it but in time it made him gain a new attitude in life, even rude at some times.

Nobody seemed to realize it at the time, but evidently this was an early sign of Iceman undergoing a secondary mutation of his own. When he repeatedly tried to evade his regular medical check-ups, school nurse Annie Ghazikhanian recognized that something odd was going on with him and pressured him to show her the wound. Bobby made her promise not to tell anyone and showed her that parts of his chest are now made of ice and he is unable to change them back to flesh and blood. Iceman wonders if he will entirely turn into ice on a permanent basis.

He developed an attitude that, to some of the newer addition to the X-Men, like Stacy X, Juggernaut and Northstar, he comes across as rather arrogant, denouncing their status as team members, as they have not been around as long as he. Iceman even went as far as offending Nightcrawler by claiming that only the original five, and no one else, has the right to call themselves an X-Man.

Bobby was further frustrated when Havok and Polaris announced their imminent wedding, him having carried a torch for Lorna for quite some time. In his frustration he turned to Annie, who had problems with the wedding too, as she was secretly in love with Havok. The nurse surprised him with the accusation of him being a racist – feeling comfortable as a mutant who could pass like a human when needed, opposed to being a fully obvious mutant or a "mere" human. With his secondary mutation manifesting, though, Iceman was in danger of losing this status. Shocked by the truth of her words, Bobby fully opened up about his fears, that as a man fully made of ice he could never feel the warmth of a physical relationship again. Touched, Annie allowed him to kiss her, but when Havok called off the wedding, wanting to be with Annie instead, she quickly dumped Bobby.

Upon encountering Azazel and his followers, Iceman's body is shattered from the neck down. Afterward, he regains his entire ice form, but cannot change back to his human appearance. As a result, Bobby becomes both bitter and despondent because of this drastic change.

Rogue's Team
Iceman joins Rogue's team after she tells him that she wants him as a member. Their first mission as a team is to fight a new threat, a powerful group known as the Children of the Vault. The team is successful and during this time, Bobby learns that he can be completely destroyed but then pull himself back together again. It was shown several times during the arc.

The next mission for the team was to locate a man called Pandemic and defeat him. The team was again successful, but Rogue was infected with a virus called Strain 88. Cable took the team, including Bobby, to his island so Rogue could get treatment.

While on Cable's island, the team and Iceman began working to defeat the Shi'ar weapon known as the Hecatomb. During the chaos, he shared a passionate kiss with Mystique. Even as he did so, he saved many lives by containing the explosion of the Conquistador, and, later, the Hecatomb itself.

Blinded by the Light
As the team recovers from Hecatomb attack in Rogue's childhood home, it appears that Mystique and Iceman begin a romantic relationship. This was a front, as Mystique was using Iceman and the X-Men as a Marauder spy for Mister Sinister. Marauders soon infiltrated the house; they attempt to gain access to Destiny's Diaries on the order of Mr. Sinister (who has been gathering information about the future from anybody and anything that could foretell the future). Bobby and Cannonball escape from the Marauders in the X-Jet, with help from Emma Frost. They are pursued by Sunfire; they manage to get the better of him and take him prisoner, but not before he manages to cripple the jet. While Sunfire is unconscious, Iceman and Sam discuss the Mauraders' plan to eliminate all precognitive mutants and anyone with knowledge of the future as well as retrieving Destiny's Diaries before the Marauders can. During this time, Bobby displayed sub-atomic control of energy transfers when he prevented Sunfire from using his fire-based powers.

Cannonball and Bobby, telepathically prompted by Emma Frost, attempt to recover the diaries which are hidden in a dilapidated brewery. Mr. Sinister uses the reverse-engineered version of Xavier's Cerebro to track the pair of X-Men to the brewery. The Marauders attack Cannonball and Iceman and overtake them. Bobby, while in his ice form, suffers a gunshot wound from Mystique, which severs one of his arms above the elbow. Mister Sinister, who takes Cannonball prisoner, attempts to telepathically erase his mind so that the X-Men will find him as an empty shell. Iceman attacks Sinister, distracting him, which allows both of the X-Men to escape.

Messiah Complex

The New X-Men team decided to raid the headquarters of the Purifiers in Washington, D.C., but were forced to retreat. Pixie teleported them back to the mansion in a rush, but the entire team was scattered between D.C. and Westchester. Iceman, after recovering from his injuries, volunteered to go look for them and was given telepathic directions by Emma Frost.

Iceman was successful in finding the New X-Men, most of them injured. On the way back, they found that the O*N*E* Sentinels guarding the Xavier Institute had become infected by nano-Sentinels and attacked the school. Iceman and New X-Man X-23 helped out in the battle with the O*N*E* Sentinels. With the help of Dust and X-23, the X-Men were able to survive this battle but the nano-Sentinel infected human escaped.

Soon, Iceman participated in the final battle against the Marauders, the Acolytes, and Predator X. He was one of the X-Men who came running in to fight Predator X after it swallowed Wolverine whole. However, he also witnesses his mentor, Professor Xavier, "killed" by Bishop's bullet, which was not meant for him.

Divided We Stand

Iceman arrives in San Francisco, where he was set to meet Hepzibah, Warpath, and Angel. All four are caught in the effects of a citywide illusion created by Martinique Jason, who used her powers to transform the city into a hippie paradise. Now calling himself "Frosty", he and the others are sent by Martinique to confront Scott Summers and Emma Frost. Emma Frost is able to break up the illusion and free everyone. They eventually set up their base of operations in San Francisco as X-Men.

Secret Invasion and Utopia

Iceman is one of the X-Men that assists in fighting the Skrull invasion in San Francisco.

Iceman rescues Colossus from Venom and is later made a part of a team to battle Emma Frost's Dark X-Men. During the final battle on Utopia, Iceman teams up with the X-Students to take on Mimic. Iceman had the labor of providing water to the population. He attempted to use humor to keep everyone's spirits up even though he believed that the situation was helpless and that the X-Men were living in the last days of mutantkind. Bobby then helped defeat Predator X and also helped stop Selene's resurrected army's invasion of Utopia.

Second Coming
During the battle with Bastion's Nimrod Sentinels, Iceman is severely injured following an attack from one of them that reversed his ice form and left him with burns on his body. He is only there for a short time because his mutant powers help him minimize the injuries he suffered and he is seen back in battle alongside Psylocke and the other X-Men.

Post Schism
Early solicitations show that after Wolverine and Cyclops have a major falling out, Wolverine decides to branch off and open The Jean Grey School for Higher Learning back in New York. Iceman is the first person Wolverine approaches and recruits to his new X-Men squad as both a professor and teammate. Iceman is chosen because Wolverine feels he has the kind of spirit the new school needs. He also has an off-and-on romantic relationship with Kitty Pryde.

Extraordinary X-Men
When the Terrigen became toxic for mutants, Iceman was one of the recruits in Storm's new team dedicated to protecting mutants from the Terrigen by leading them to X-haven. Iceman mostly works alongside Nightcrawler, helping him search for Colossus after he is transformed into one of Apocalypse's new horsemen. Iceman and Nightcrawler manage to track Colossus to Egypt, where he ambushes them and almost kills them until another squad of X-Men comes in to help. After that Iceman joins the X-Men when they declare war against the Inhumans after discovering that in a matter of weeks the Terrigen will render earth as completely uninhabitable for mutants.

Fantastic Four Returns
Iceman is among the heroes summoned by Mr. Fantastic - a group consisting of former substitute members of the Fantastic Four - to help the Future Foundation against the cosmic entity known as the Griever. However, the Human Torch objects to Iceman's presence during the battle, emphatically asserting that Iceman was never a member of the FF. Iceman states that he was made a member during an adventure involving Namor. The Torch simply counters with "That didn't COUNT!"

As recounted in Fantastic Four vol. 6 #24, Iceman's induction into the FF did not feature Namor, but occurred during the early days of the FF and the original X-Men. One morning years ago, the youthful Torch 'quit' the FF in an immature fit of pique. That same day, the sensitive teen-aged Iceman left the X-Men after being laughed at by his peers for his poor showing in a Danger Room exercise. Iceman encountered the remaining FF members and assisted them with a day-long series of crises, being casually admitted to the team as a result. When the Torch discovered that he had been replaced, he attacked Iceman during the FF's current battle and forcefully declared that Iceman was not an FF member. The Invisible Girl forced the pair to work together to help defeat the FF's final opponent of the day. Iceman was then telepathically summoned back to the X-Men by Professor X, who praised his student's performance. Mr. Fantastic told the departing Iceman that he could return to the FF whenever he wanted. The Torch was also 'readmitted', with a penance of a week's laundry detail.

In the present time, Iceman returns the teen-aged Franklin Richards to the FF's Yancy Street home/headquarters from Krakoa and is recognized by the building's security system as an FF member. This angers the Torch once again, and he declares that Iceman had never been a member of the team. The two men bicker over the issue until Iceman realizes that the Torch was never upset about Iceman replacing him on the team, but believes that he was trying to take his place in the FF family. The Torch finally admits that what bothered him most was that other substitute members—who were also considered family by the FF—were always brought in due to major events, and that if Iceman was the actual first substitute member, that meant the Torch had given up his place "over nothing." The Torch ultimately drops the matter of Iceman's legitimacy and says that he was an official substitute FF member, and is also a part of the FF 'family'.

Solo series
After being outed as gay by the time-displaced Jean Grey, the younger time-displaced Iceman confronts his older self, asking him why he has been presenting as straight for most of his adult life. The older Bobby breaks down and admits that he has known he was gay for a long time but forcibly repressed that part of himself, fearful of how others would react. He further acknowledges that he was scared to reveal his true self to the world due to already facing prejudice for being a mutant and not wanting to receive hatred for another part of himself. Following all of this, Bobby decides to take a break from the limelight and focus on himself, declining to join the new X-team formed by Kitty Pryde, instead acting as a reserve member and teaching classes at the Xavier School. After a training session with his younger self, Bobby sees the time-displaced Iceman head out for a date with his boyfriend Romeo while he tries to set up an online dating profile to meet guys. He receives a text from his mother stating that his father has had a heart attack so Bobby rushes to the hospital only to be chastises by his father for missing family events due to his commitments as a superhero. Following a brief battle in the hospital, Bobby's parents ask him to leave, angry that their mutant son is bringing yet more trouble into their lives. On a mission with Kitty to rescue a new mutant, she confronts Bobby about being gay, asking why he could not tell her himself, meaning she had to find out from a secondary source. She reassures him that she only wants to help him and lets him know she is there if he ever wants to talk but suggests he should come out to his parents. Bobby arranges dinner with his family but he is constantly subjected anti-mutant rhetoric from his parents. The dinner is interrupted by a gang of Purifiers but, although Iceman takes them down quickly and the lives of his parents, they are angry that their house has been destroyed because of him and send him away (although his mother promises to try and convince his father to visit him at the X-Mansion). When the mutant that he and Kitty rescues goes missing, Iceman tracks him to a nearby nightclub where he discovers that Daken is responsible for luring him away. Daken tries to flirt with Bobby to distract him but Iceman freezes him and attempts to convince the mutant to return to the Xavier School, though he refuses. Daken mocks Bobby, saying that he can smell his fear and insecurity. Upon returning, Kitty surprises Bobby by revealing that his parents have arrived for a visit. He tells them he is gay and they both react negatively, angry that their son is both a mutant and a gay man. They chastise him for letting everyone else find out before them and try to convince him that he is straight, due to having been with women in the past. The family argument is interrupted by Juggernaut, who attacks the school looking for the young X-Men. Iceman defeats him by pushing his powers and returns to the mansion to find his father is still there. He had obtained Bobby's draft of a coming out letter from Kitty and the two men begin to reconcile.

Bobby reconnects with his former Champions teammates, Angel, Hercules, Ghost Rider and Darkstar, so they reminisce about their time with Black Widow. Bobby runs into a guy, Judah, while out shopping and he agrees to meet him that night at a local gay bar, with the rest of the Champions acting as his wingmen. The date appears to be going well but is interrupted by an attack by some Sentinels. Bobby's relationship with Judah continues to develop and he decides to move to L.A. to be closer to him. While fighting Pyro with his younger self, Bobby explains that his mother has finally made contact with him for the first time since he came out and that she wants to invite both of them to dinner. Time-displaced Iceman agrees on the condition that Bobby tries to talk sense into Romeo, who hasn't called him in weeks. Meanwhile, Daken begins training his new mutant protégée for a secret mission. When both the younger Bobby and the older Bobby arrive at the restaurant, their parents see the younger Bobby as a chance to raise a new son in a way that suits them but the time-displaced Iceman refuses, saying that he is still gay and wants to live life on his own terms before they both storm out. During Bobby's moving away party at the X-Mansion, Daken uses the Purifiers to distract the other X-Men while he and his apprentice infiltrate the school and ambush Bobby. The young mutant uses his levelled-up powers to increase Daken's strength by turning him into Apocalypse's horseman Death and he mortally wounds Judah with his claws before engaging Iceman in combat. Bobby manages to defeat Daken with a kiss which freezes Death's powers but Daken escapes and Judah breaks up with Bobby because his life is too much for him to deal with.

After teaming with Bishop to help the Morlocks who came under threat by Mister Sinister, Bobby finds himself approached by Emma Frost who asks him for his help. Ignoring Kitty's protests, he agrees and Emma explains that her Father, who subjected her brother Christian to conversion therapy before having him institutionalized, has recently let him out and reinstalled him as the new heir to the Frost business empire. When they arrive, they discover that Christian has murdered their Father and is exhibiting his own powers. Bobby and Emma help to free Christian from his mental breakdown and Emma decides to stay with him. Joining with his friends Spider-Man and Firestar, Bobby discovers that Sinister was behind the attack on the Morlocks and confronts him in his safehouse. Sinister, intent on trying to unlock the secrets of Iceman's DNA by dissecting him, sends forth an army of experimental ice creatures but Bobby's Omega Level powers absorb them all into him and he fires Mister Sinister into space. Celebrating his birthday, Bobby is confronted by Ice Wizard, a future version of himself from an alternate timeline. Ice Wizard warns Bobby that he must quit the X-Men and stop using his powers to avoid a world-destroying series of events happening. He explains that Daken seduces him and manipulates him into sacrificing the other X-Men before betraying him and gaining Thanos-level powers. Bobby is adamant that this won't happen and the two engage in battle. Jean Grey arrives and Bobby finally confronts her for the actions of her younger self when she outed him. Bobby explains to Ice Wizard that he is going to live life on his terms and that nobody, not even his future self, is going to decide for him. Bobby returns to his birthday celebration where Christian arrives and hands him a large sum of money which Bobby gives to the Morlocks. A content Bobby messages Judah, asking if he would like to meet up as friends.

Powers and abilities

Iceman possesses the power to instantly decrease the temperature of ambient water vapor in his immediate environment to below zero degrees Celsius, thereby freezing it into ice. He is able to make ice that will not break unless he wills it to. In this manner he is able to quickly form a great variety of ice structures, including projectiles, shields, ladders, baseball bats, etc. Iceman often makes ice slides which form rapidly beneath and behind his feet, moving him along the slick surface at high speeds. He is also able to form exceedingly complicated structures within relative short time, such as miniature cities. Originally, Iceman's own body temperature would lower dramatically when his powers were active, reaching  within a few tenths of a second (now his body usually converts to organic ice; see below). Iceman is immune to sub-zero temperatures; he is also able to perceive the thermal energy level of objects around him. Because cold is the absence of heat, Iceman does not actually 'emanate' cold; rather, he decreases thermal energy. As mentioned by writer Mike Carey, Iceman is "an Omega-level mutant ... [and] has powers that can influence the ecosystem of the entire world." Iceman has yet to tap into his full mutant potential, but over the years he has taken more interest in developing his abilities.

In his early appearances, Iceman generally covered his body in a thick layer of what appeared to be snow; hence he looked more like a traditional snowman than an ice-man. Upon further training in the use of his powers, he was able to fashion an armor of solid ice around his body when using his powers, which afforded him some degree of protection against concussive force and projectiles. Later on, he manifested the ability to convert the tissue of his body into organic ice. He sometimes augments his organic ice form with razor sharp adornments to his shoulders, elbows, knees, and fists. Iceman has also been able to move rapidly to another distant location while in his organic ice form, being able to deposit his bodily mass into a river and reconstitute his entire mass a great distance away in a matter of minutes (by temporarily merging his molecules with those of the river). On one occasion, Iceman suffered a severe chest injury while in his ice form and was able to heal himself by converting back into his normal human form.

Iceman is also able to reconstitute his organic ice form if any part of it is damaged, or even if it is completely shattered, without permanently harming himself. He can temporarily add the mass of a body of water to his own, increasing his mass, size, and strength. He can survive not only as ice, but as liquid water and water vapor. He can also transform his body from a gaseous state back to a solid, although it is physically and mentally taxing. Iceman can also freeze sea water, as seen during the "Operation: Zero Tolerance" story arc. While he usually does not use his powers in lethal ways, his powers are so vast that they extend to the molecular level, to the point that he can freeze all of the molecules of an object/being with a thought; he once froze every single molecule of water within the body of David Haller. Iceman is also able to dissolve his own icy constructs.

Iceman's powers were pushed to their limit while possessed by Emma Frost, who used Iceman to discover the fate of her Hellions. During this time Iceman was able to control all forms of moisture, freeze fluids inside people's bodies, travel as a liquid, solid or gas. Not even the combined might of the X-Men Gold team was able to stop Emma Frost in Iceman's body. Following this, Bobby confronted Emma about how she was able to use his powers so effectively. While together they made some initial progress, she refused to train him further. Instead he turned to Storm because they share similar elemental powers and she agreed to tutor him.

When Iceman was injected with Mister Sinister's neuro-inhibiter by Mystique, he was able to save himself by drawing in all of the ambient moisture around him, rapidly replacing his poisoned cells with healthy material before the injection could kill him.

During the 2013–2014 "Battle of the Atom" storyline, Iceman's future self revealed that he has the ability to create semi-independent ice structures that can act on their own, although one of these structures—demonstrating a Hulk-like physique and intellect—has gone on to join the future version of the Brotherhood.

Aside from his superhuman powers, Iceman is also a fair hand-to-hand combatant, and received combat training at Xavier's School as well as coaching from the Black Widow and Hercules while serving with the Champions of Los Angeles. Iceman has taken as much combat training as Cyclops or Beast.

Characterization

Personality
According to writer Mike Carey "one of Iceman's best personality traits is that emotionally Bobby Drake is like the ice he manipulates—not cold but transparent. 'He's devastatingly honest. He is very up-front with his emotions and his thoughts all the time.'" "Also, he's obviously incredibly brave both in terms of facing external, physical danger as well as facing up to unpleasant situations and admitting his own mistakes."

Friendships and relationships
Iceman had a brief relationship with a Japanese-American New Yorker named Opal Tanaka. He subsequently exhibited strong feelings for his fellow X-Man Polaris, but she did not return those feelings, due to her feelings towards Havok. Northstar developed an unrequited crush for Iceman during their time on the same team, though Iceman never did find out about this. Iceman later had a brief relationship with the Xavier School's nurse, Annie, but she eventually left him for Havok, who had just left Polaris at the altar. When Iceman attempted to rekindle his relationship with Polaris, that too ended abruptly, and Polaris returned to Havok. Iceman then had a relationship with the X-Men's enemy Mystique, who later betrayed him, despite her continued fixation on him, in as much as she stated that she would either kill him or cure him of his personal uncertainty.

Iceman has long-lasting friendships with Spider-Man, Firestar and the Human Torch.

Sexuality
In All-New X-Men #40, the time-displaced Iceman is revealed to be gay, which eventually forces the youth to confront the adult version of himself about the matter. As both speak, the adult Iceman confirms the fact and that he had put all his energy into just being an X-Man as he couldn't cope with being a mutant and gay simultaneously. With the help of his younger self and Jean Grey, however, he finally comes to terms with his own sexuality, and comes out to fellow gay X-Man Anole in Extraordinary X-Men #6. The end of the Extermination X-Men event saw the redirecting of the time displaced version of Bobby back into the "closet" when he returned to his original timeline alongside the other X-Men, due to a mind lock by Jean Grey. In the present day, the current version retains both sets of memories and remains an out gay man.

Cultural impact and legacy

Critical reception 
Peter Eckhardt of CBR.com referred to Iceman as "the biggest name amongst queer X-Men," writing, "Iceman is an Omega-Level mutant and a longtime fan-favorite character. Iceman was only recently revealed as gay in a story handled somewhat clumsily in 2014's All-New X-Men #40 (written by Brian Michael Bendis and drawn by Mahmud Asrar). Nevertheless, writers as far back as the 1980s hinted that Bobby was gay, particularly in the 1990s when Iceman struggled with his sense of identity. Today, Iceman's story inspires and excites those looking for anything from understanding their own identity to epic, ice-based colossi." Mey Rude of Out stated, "While Northstar was the first out gay superhero in a Marvel comic, Iceman is his more famous gay X-Men teammate. Bobby Drake didn't come out until just recently in the comics, following some time travel shenanigans, but he’s already become a gay favorite." Alyssa  Gawaran of MovieWeb said, "Iceman, also a big part of the X-Men in the Marvel Comics, is one of the more groundbreaking LGBTQ+ characters in Marvel. Iceman broke boundaries in the franchise as he became the first-ever gay leading superhero to headline a comic, the "coming out moment" reported in a 2015 Vox article. Marvel has recently released Marauders Annual #1 that features a very heartwarming prom segment between Bobby Drake (Iceman) and his boyfriend, a new face to the comics, Christian Frost." Joshua Yehl of IGN described Iceman as "the perfect gay boyfriend," saying, "Bobby isn’t out to be the biggest, baddest guy around. He’s a more grounded and relatable guy, and while he often broadcasts his cocky attitude and wisecracking humor during battle, he’s proven time and time again that his heart is in the right place when it comes to being there for his teammates. There’s something incredibly charming about a guy who could become the Indomitable Iceman, laying waste to enemies with his icy wrath, yet he chooses to stay boy-next-door Bobby Drake, a funny, self-sacrificing guy who values being a friend and hero over becoming the most powerful guy in the room. Being gay has a lot in common with being a mutant, as excellently displayed during Iceman’s “coming out” scene in X2: X-Men United. You’re born that way, you will face bullying and discrimination for it, and those who claim to be your friends and family may turn their backs on you because of it. Bobby’s experiences as both a mutant and an out gay man would make him an incredibly empathetic and understanding partner, one who would share his feelings and be there to help with yours. So even though he may not be the strongest mutant around, he’d be a hero to you in every way that counts."

Accolades 

 In 2014, Entertainment Weekly ranked Iceman 27th in their "Let's rank every X-Man ever" list.
 In 2014, BuzzFeed ranked Iceman 17th in their "95 X-Men Members Ranked From Worst To Best" list.
 In 2016, SBS included Iceman in their "10 queer superheroes who changed the face of comics" list.
 In 2018, CBR.com ranked Iceman 25th in their "X-Men's Greatest Leaders" list.
 In 2018, The Daily Dot ranked Iceman 7th in their "Top 12 LGBTQ superheroes in DC and Marvel comics" list.
 In 2018, CBR.com ranked Iceman 11th in their "Age Of Apocalypse: The 30 Strongest Characters In Marvel's Coolest Alternate World" list.
 In 2019, CBR.com ranked Iceman 3rd in their "10 Most Powerful LGBT Characters In Comics" list and 9th in their "X-Men: All Of Marvel's Omega-Level Mutants, Ranked By Power" list.
 In 2019, BBC included Iceman in their "Five LGBTQ+ superheroes you need to know about" list.
 In 2019, Screen Rant ranked Iceman 1st in their "10 LGBTQA Characters Who Should Be Introduced To The MCU" list.
 In 2020, Gay Times included Iceman in their "13 queer superheroes we need to see in the Marvel Cinematic Universe" list.
 In 2021, BuzzFeed ranked Iceman 3rd in their "11 Of The Most Important Marvel And DC LGBTQ+ Superheroes" list.
 In 2021, CBR.com ranked Iceman in their "Marvel: The 10 Strongest Male X-Men" list.
 In 2022, The Mary Sue ranked Iceman 9th in their "10 Most Powerful X-Men of All Time" list.
 In 2022, MovieWeb ranked Iceman 4th in their "8 LGBTQ+ Marvel Comics Characters That Need to Be in the MCU" list.
 In 2022, Digital Trends ranked Iceman 10th in their "Marvel’s most powerful mutants" list.
 In 2022, CBR.com ranked Iceman 7th in their "10 Most Terrifying X-Men" list, 8th in their "10 X-Men Characters Fans Want In the MCU" list, 9th in their "15 Strongest Omega-Level X-Men" list, 10th in their "10 Greatest X-Men" list, and 10th in their "X-Men: 10 Queer and Awesome Mutants" list.
 In 2022, Screen Rant included Iceman in their "10 Most Powerful X-Men" list.

Literary reception

Volumes

Iceman and Angel - 2011 
According to Diamond Comic Distributors, Iceman and Angel #1 was the 161st best selling comic book in March 2011.

Ryan K. Lindsay of CBR.com called Iceman and Angel #1 "as much fun as you want, but as pithy as you expect too," asserting, "A one-shot should be a comic that stands on its own, and this issue certainly does that. It needs to give you enough narrative meat to feel like the money was well invested, and this issue mostly does that. It should elicit some form of strong reaction from you in the few pages it has, and this issue works hard to make you laugh and is more successful than not. See Namor score some bagels and Googam become a broheim. It's not earth shattering but it is solid fun and sometimes that's just what you need. Pick up this comic and feel the freedom of old funny done-in-one comics just like they did when you were a kid where the parts add up to greater than the actual whole." David Brothers of ComicsAlliance ranked Iceman and Angel #1 10th in their "10 Top Marvel Comics Coming in March 2011," saying, "One of the best things we don't see much of any more is the relationship between the original X-Men. The modern series is all about hard decisions, hard edges, and hard core self protection, but back in the day, they were just a bunch of kids who hung out together. Iceman and Angel in particular were pretty fun together, because one was a goofball and the other was a self-styled ladies man. Brian Clevinger has proven that he can do stories like this, where he takes a slice of time and expands on it in a meaningful way, and Juan Doe is a pretty great artist. Add in GOOM, a classic Marvel villain, and you've got a story that I think is going to be a pretty good read. X-Men First Class may be dead in name, but these one-shots are doing a pretty good job of keeping the feeling alive."

Iceman - 2017 
According to Diamond Comic Distributors, Iceman #1 was the 62nd best selling comic book in June 2017. Iceman #1 was the 655-656th best selling comic book in 2017.

Matthew Aguilar of Comicbook.com gave Iceman #1 a grade of 4 out of 5 stars, writing, "On the art side of things, the book is a mixed bag. Alessandro Vitti's pencils and Rachelle Rosenberg's colors shine when ice is involved in some form or fashion, as referenced early and later in the book. In the middle, though things get a bit muddy, and the facial expressions suffer. Not enough to detract in a huge way, but the book definitely improves when Drake is in his ice form. Overall writer Sina Grace is off to an excellent start here, providing a refreshing look into a fan favorite character that has always been more than his powers but needed someone to bring that out of him. It looks like this time is up for the task." Jesse Schedeen of IGN gave Iceman #1 a grade of 7.8 out of 10, stating, "Iceman #1 doesn't make the strongest case for this series as an ongoing story, as it could just as easily be a standalone one-shot starring the frozen X-Man. But it's a very well-executed story regardless, one that showcases Bobby Drake's crazy personal life while still making the most of his incredible powers. Iceman is shaping up to be a worthy addition to the ResurrXion lineup."

Iceman - 2018 
According to Diamond Comic Distributors, Iceman #1 was the 43rd best selling comic book in September 2018. Iceman #1 was the 508th best selling comic book in 2018.

Jamie Lovett of Comicook.com called Iceman #1 a "well-crafted book," saying,"Iceman #1 is a stellar return. Most impressive is how the issue is completely capable of standing alone, but also seeds an exciting story to come. Even a casual X-Men fan will recognize the deadliness of the threat behind this issue's attempts to recreate the "Mutant Massacre." Longtime X-Men fans, and fans of Iceman, in particular, will get something extra out of the last page reveal of who's waiting for Bobby at home. Iceman #1 is a triumphant return for an underappreciated series. The longer Sina Grace writes Bobby Drake, the more Iceman develops into a truly compelling, relatable leading man. Grace found the perfect artistic partners in Nathan Stockman and Frederico Blee. Here's hoping Iceman gets more of the attention it deserves the second time around." Maite Molina of ComicsVerse gave Iceman #1 a score of 80%, asserting, "Iceman #1 is a resolute start to a new run. Thanks to some palpable character development and an intriguing plot, the issue succeeds in gripping a reader’s attention. The stage has been set for some intriguing new story arcs, ones that will feature some familiar, sinister villains. Hopefully, Bobby Drake is ready for these impending challenges, ones that he may not even see coming."

Other versions

Time-displaced Iceman

All-New X-Men

Following the war with the Phoenix Five, as Cyclops begins to lash out against government oppression of mutants, a chance comment by Bobby about how the old Cyclops wouldn't tolerate what he is currently doing inspires Beast to travel back in time and recruit the original five X-Men to stop Cyclops. The team decides to stay in the present instead of returning into the past. They are now called the All-New X-Men and led by Kitty Pryde. The past and present Bobby are particularly shocked when they see each other. The younger Bobby is especially shocked by the older Bobby's Omega level powers, like creating ice golems, and especially his future "Ice Wizard" self in the Battle of the Atom. Eventually he and the All-New X-Men and the Guardians of the Galaxy travel to the Shiar Empire to rescue Jean Grey from a trial for the genocide that her future Dark Phoenix self committed. The team is then teleported into the Ultimate Marvel universe, where he stumbles into Mole Man's lair. He proudly creates his first ice golem in order to escape.

Returning to their universe, the team are reunited with Cyclops when they are called upon to aid the Guardians of the Galaxy again in retrieving the fabled Black Vortex. Cyclops, Iceman and Groot become superpowered by the Vortex before returning it to Captain Marvel.

Later, the younger, time-displaced Bobby is forced to confront being gay by his teammate, Jean, who privately asks him why he calls women "hot", when she knows via her psychic abilities that he is gay. This causes the younger Bobby to speculate as to the complicated identity issues faced by his older self and the decisions his older self may have made in the time between them. Together with the young Jean, the young Bobby confronts his older self, who admits to being gay, having 'concealed' that part of himself so that he could have avoid being prejudiced against for another part of himself.

Bobby joins the time-displaced Cyclops, Angel and Beast, as well as Kid Apocalypse, All-New Wolverine and Oya as they road-trip around America trying to make their own mark on the world. Bobby is initially reluctant to talk about his sexuality with his teammates until Oya and Kid Apocalypse take him to a gay club in an attempt to make him more comfortable. He embarrasses himself and runs into Romeo, an Inhuman with the ability to manipulate and feel others' emotions. Romeo makes Bobby more comfortable and the two begin a relationship. The two are later caught in the middle when the X-Men declare war on the Inhumans. Bobby joins the X-Men when they attack New Attilan but quickly breaks off from the battle to find Romeo, with the two escaping together.

X-Men Blue

After the X-Men's war against the Inhumans for the Terrigen ends, Iceman joins the rest of the young X-Men on an attempted return to their original timeline but they quickly realize that theirs isn't part of the Earth 616 timeline, leaving them stuck in that present time with no knowledge where they were originally from. Upon learning this, Iceman joins the rest of the young X-Men and leaves the rest of the X-Men to find their place in the world. Iceman then joins Magneto in Madripoor along with the rest of the time-displaced X-Men; however, due to a lack of trust in their new leader, the X-Men make plans and train in case Magneto returns to his former villainous ways to kill them. Instead of training with his teammates, Iceman spends most of his time trying to reach out Romeo unsuccessfully, placing him into a stupor.

The time-displaced X-Men continue fighting crime in the present day although following a battle with the Brotherhood of Evil Mutants from an alternate timeline, they are disheartened to realize that they must eventually return to their original time. This particularly upsets Bobby who is sad that all of their growth as people will be undone once they go back. While the team are in space working alongside Venom to defeat the Poisons, a race of mind-controlling symbiotes, Magneto attacks several Hellfire Club parties searching for Emma Frost. The X-Men find her first and offer to protect her from Magneto although they quickly discover that he had taken mutant growth hormones to enhance his powers and, rather than kill the team he has mentored, Magneto leaves. Young Jean senses that they must return to their own time period soon and the X-Men have heart-to-hearts with their adult selves. During a game of pool with older Iceman, Bobby breaks down, knowing that his memory of the present must be erased and he will be forced back into the closet and, despite Iceman's best efforts to convince his younger self that he will grow up to be someone awesome, Bobby admits that he likes the person he has already become but that remaining that person is no longer an option. As the team prepare to leave, a news report announces that Magneto has formed a new brotherhood, leading the X-Men to decide to stay in the present for a little while longer.

Extermination

While en route to help young Cyclops, Bobby is attacked by a mysterious assailant but is rescued by Cable, who urges him to flee. Iceman refuses but is incapacitated and captured while Cable is killed. Young Jean attempts to use Cerebro to locate Bobby but states that she is unable to find him. In a secret lab, the man who attacked Bobby is revealed to be a time-displaced version of Cable who has him locked up in a tube. Kitty gathers all of the X-Men, who split into four teams tasked with protecting one of the remaining time-displaced X-Men. Young Jean uses her telepathy to guide her team to young Cable's base, where he admits to murdering his older self because he had failed in his mission to maintain the timeline by allowing the young X-Men to stay in the present for so long. They discover that Cable has been genetically modifying young Iceman so that he looks the way he looked when he left his original time period. He releases Bobby and teleports them all to Atlantis, where Ahab is attempting to kill young Cyclops so that the timeline can never be restored. The X-Men find themselves overwhelmed by Ahab's forces and Cable convinces the young X-Men that they must return home immediately in order to save the others. Young Iceman breaks down to his older self, admitting he doesn't want to be forced back into the closet but the present day Bobby tells him that his younger self finally allowed him to accept that he was gay and promises that he will be finally be able to truly be himself when he grows up. Cable then sends the X-Men back to their original time, informing them that everything will return to normal once they officially close the time loop. In 1964, the young X-Men change into their original clothes and young Jean performs a mind wipe so that they won't remember their time in the present day although she informs them that she is able to lock their memories away so that, once the loop is closed, their older selves will regain those memories. Back in modern day, the founding X-Men inherit the memories of their younger selves allowing them to defeat Ahab. Returned to their original time, the young X-Men forget about their adventures in the present and are greeted by Professor Xavier.

1602
Iceman is Roberto Trefusis in the miniseries Marvel 1602, a member of the group of "witchbreeds" founded by Carlos Javier and led by Scotius Summerisle. He is the nephew of naval commander Sir Francis Drake. As in the Marvel Universe, he generates ice and can assume a physical ice form.

"Age of Apocalypse"

In the "Age of Apocalypse" storyline, Bobby, along with the rest of the X-Men, is trained by Magneto. Because Magneto is harder on his students than Professor X, Bobby lacks his 616-counterpart's sense of humor. Instead, Bobby becomes very cold and inhuman, making his teammates feel uncomfortable. In addition to his normal abilities, Bobby is capable of breaking down his body and merging it with another body of water to travel great distances in a matter of seconds. He can bring others along through a process that he calls "moisture molecular inversion", though it is a painful process for the passengers. Bobby is also able to reconstitute his body from broken pieces. Just before Apocalypse's defeat, Colossus stormed right through Iceman, causing him to fall into pieces in an attempt to reach his sister. A couple of months later, Iceman, Exodus, Wild Child, and Morph were sent on a secret mission by Magneto; for a time, only Wild Child's fate was revealed.

Iceman returned in the Uncanny X-Force arc "The Dark Angel Saga", when the title team was forced to travel to the AoA reality. He abandoned the X-Men during a battle with the minions of Weapon X, who had by this time been transformed into that world's new Apocalypse, a defection later revealed to be the result of Iceman's having lost faith in his X-Men's ability to save their world. He was soon brought to Earth-616 by the Dark Beast, where he joined forces with Archangel on his quest to eradicate all life on Earth so he could create a new evolution process. Tired of seeing the people he cared about being killed fighting what he thought to be an unwinnable war, Drake agreed to help Archangel – despite the latter's now being the mainstream Marvel Universe's version of Drake's X-Men's arch-enemy, Apocalypse – in exchange for transport to the relative paradise that was Earth-616.

After X-Force defeated Archangel, Bobby managed to escape with McCoy and most of Archangel's other minions, but eventually broke away from them and went into hiding, living a life of hedonistic bliss in Madripoor. The "Age of Apocalypse" version of Nightcrawler – who, after being brought to Earth-616 along with the rest of his world's X-Men to help take down Archangel, decided to stay behind there in order to track down and kill the various villains who also came to the mainstream Marvel Universe – eventually tracked Bobby down to execute him for his treason. Nightcrawler is quickly overwhelmed by Drake's avatars, but eventually forces Iceman into a factory boiler room, where there's not enough moisture in the air for him to effectively use his powers. Nightcrawler quickly disables his former friend, and shoves him into an incinerator, killing the once noble hero.

Earth X
During the miniseries Earth X, Bobby had become trapped in his ice form, making him vulnerable to melting.  He moves to the Arctic regions of Earth, and made an ice city for himself and the Inuit. Due to a series of events where Earth's orbital path moves, Bobby is able to return to the United States to aid in the battle against the demon Mephisto.

"House of M"
In the alternate timeline of the "House of M" storyline, Iceman was seen in Magneto's army during his rise to power. Bobby later appears as one of the Horsemen of Apocalypse because Apocalypse rescued Bobby from a mutant internment camp that his parents had sent him to. Magneto sends Apocalypse to dispose of his rival Black Panther; when Apocalypse is attacked en route by Black Panther's allies, Iceman aids him by freezing Namor solid and attempting to attack Storm, but he is severely injured by Sunfire.

Marvel Zombies
A zombified Iceman appears in Marvel Zombies: Dead Days alongside zombies Wolverine and Cyclops. Ultimately, he is seen attacking Magneto. But Iceman perished at the hands of the Master Of Magnetism himself when Iceman is cut apart.

Mutant X
In the Mutant X universe, the Asgardian god Loki amplified Bobby's powers to a dangerous level, leaving him unable to touch any living thing without killing it. Despite this, he retains a jovial and optimistic personality. When Havok has a disagreement with Magneto and decides to leave the X-Men, Ice-Man is one of those who follow him, becoming a founding member of the Six, who eventually come to be considered the world's premiere mutant team.

New Exiles
After the New Exiles land on the world of warring empires, they encounter Dame Emma Frost, head of Britain's Department X and founder of Force-X. This team includes Roberta "Bobby" Drake, a female version of Bobby who is code named Aurion and displays ice-based abilities.

"Battle of the Atom"
In the alternate future witnessed in the "Battle of the Atom" storyline, Iceman's had truly evolved to become Sir Robert, the wizard-like Icemaster. As one of the most respected X-Men, he had incredible control over his powers and could even grow a beard! Though never outright mentioned, he may had a relationship with Kitty Pryde and even fathered a son with her, denoting the existence of Carmen Drake, a boy with the powers of both Iceman and Shadowcat. He has also developed the ability to create semi-independent ice structures that can act on their own, although one of these structures, possessing a Hulk-like physique and intellect, has gone on to join the future version of the Brotherhood, resulting in the Brotherhood using the duplicate to reinforce the illusion of themselves as the future X-Men. The duplicate Iceman was defeated by the O5 Iceman, the present Iceman, and the future Iceman during the battle in the past (Prompting the youngest Iceman to note that they only needed one more Iceman for a five-a-side basketball team).

Icemaster later returned to the mainstream marvel universe and confronts Iceman about trusts and decisions. He does it in order to prevent him from doing the same mistakes Icemaster did in the future. Knowing he had little time left, Icemaster eventually revealed to Iceman that after beginning a relationship with Daken, they both led the X-Men to space in order to prevent the Shi'ar from overwhelm the Earth and lay waste to it. However Icemaster would discover that Daken's plan was actually to obtain the M'Kraan Crystal in the first place, killing in the process the other X-Men and later Deathbird herself. Icemaster attempts to stop Daken, but he is seconds too late as having the Nexus of all Realities made Daken a Thanos-level player in the cosmos, and he acted as such. Icemaster eventually became convinced, after seeing Bobby's character growth, that his present self had matured beyond what he remembered, leaving the future open for new decisions to be made. With his mission apparently completed, Icemaster turns into thin air soon afterwards.

Ronin
In the alternate reality of X-Men: Ronin Iceman is a murderous ninja in the employ of the Hellfire Club.  He works with Pyro and Avalanche as part of the 'Shadowcat Clan' and battles the X-Men.

Shadow-X
New Excalibur battles an evil counterpart of Iceman, who is a member of the Shadow-X, the X-Men of an alternate reality in which Professor X was possessed by the Shadow King. They are brought to Earth-616 as a result of M-Day. He appeared to be mute and died during the final battle against Albion.

Spider-Verse
In Edge of Spider-verse: Web of Fear, a Spider-Man who is a member of the Captain Britain Corps witnesses Morlun about to kill Spider-Man. Later, a larger picture is shown of Firestar and Iceman lying dead, with Ms. Lion being left out, mourning her comrades.

Marvel Noir
Iceman appears in X-Men Noir as one of the X Men, a crew of talented criminals. He is depicted as being very short-tempered and paranoid. He is dubbed "Iceman", and angrily insists others refer to him that way, due to his custom of using an icepick as a weapon.

Ultimate Marvel
In the Ultimate Marvel continuity, Bobby Drake is the youngest founding member of the X-Men. He ran away from his family at the peak of government-supported Sentinel attacks, fearing his family would be killed in such an attack.

Ultimate Iceman never had the snowman look of his counterpart, instead generating a flexible ice armor from the beginning. Bobby establishes himself as a valuable asset, single-handedly taking out the Ultimates once with a gigantic ice wall (see Ultimate War), as well as single-handedly halting an invasion by Colonel Wraith and Weapon X. He was only able to be stopped by Rogue, who was in temporary possession of Marvel Girl's telepathy. Professor X has stated that Bobby is one of the three most powerful X-Men. During the World Tour arc, after enlarging his armor to form a gigantic ice troll, Bobby is greatly injured by Proteus, which resulted in a lawsuit issued by his parents against Xavier. Bobby eventually rebels against his parents, and later returns to the X-Men.

While Bobby was away from the X-Men on a vacation, he had a girlfriend, but Professor Xavier erased all memories of her from Bobby's mind when he told her too much about the X-Men (he presumably also erased the girl's memories). Upon her acceptance into the X-Men, Bobby begins to date Rogue. The pair date for a considerable amount of time, but eventually break up due to Bobby's growing feelings for Shadowcat and Rogue's feelings for Gambit. Eventually Rogue leaves, and Bobby starts to date Kitty. After this, the two rekindle their relationship, but problems erupted.

In Ultimate X-Men #80, Bishop and Hammer, time-travelers from the future, comment on how powerful Bobby will one day become. Cyclops disbanded the X-Men in Ultimate X-Men #81 and Bishop and Storm created a new team. Iceman stayed at the Institute as a student only until Xavier returned and reformed his X-Men.

Professor X is later revealed to be alive and the X-Men return to the Xavier Institute, which is also when Iceman rejoins the X-Men line up. Jean Grey soon discovers that fellow X-Man, Colossus, is using a drug called Banshee to enhance his mutant abilities. The X-Men are highly against this, but Colossus manages to convince Rogue, Dazzler, Angel, Nightcrawler, and Cyclops to join him on his own X-Men team. Iceman remains on Professor X's drug-free X-Men and fights the Banshee enhanced X-Men. Xavier's X-Men win and the two teams combine again with nobody using drugs.

The Ultimatum Wave hits the X-Men next killing several of the X-Men (Beast, Dazzler, and Nightcrawler). Magneto and the Brotherhood attack the world and Iceman helps the world's heroes fight them off. Most of the X-Men die, but Iceman (alongside Rogue, Storm, Colossus, and Jean Grey) is able to survive Magneto's attack. He is last seen demolishing the X-Mansion alongside Rogue and Jean Grey and burying the deceased X-Men in its place. He finds it hard to destroy their home, but he feels it to be the right thing to do now that Professor Xavier is dead.

Later, Bobby Drake is kicked out of his home for being a mutant. With nowhere else to go, Kitty suggests to Peter Parkers' Aunt May that he move in with her, Peter, Gwen Stacy, and Johnny Storm (who also recently moved in their household). Aunt May agrees and enrolls Bobby at Midtown High under the guise of Bobby Parker, one of Peters' cousins and shaves his hair off to help keep his, Peter's and Johnny's secret identities safe.

Without knowing where to go after Peter's death, Bobby Drake asked Kitty Pride if Johnny could come with them searching for a place where to live and hide from authorities. They found the Morlock Tunnels where they live now and help mutants in danger. Firstly they rescued Rogue, who joined them, and later Jimmy Hudson (the son of Wolverine), came to them for help after escaping Stryker's imprisonment along with other mutants he freed.

X-Men Fairy Tales
In X-Men Fairy Tales #1, Iceman appears as a white wolf with icy breath named Kori (Japanese for ice). Before he is reached by Cyclops, he appears to have lost faith in friendship.

X-Men: The End
In X-Men: The End, Iceman appears as one of the instrumental characters in the defeat of Cassandra Nova and Khan and one of the few surviving X-Men.

Old Man Logan
In the "Old Man Logan" storyline, Iceman is among the X-Men who perish at the hands of Wolverine when he is tricked by Mysterio into believing his friends are super-villains attacking the mansion.

In other media

Television

 Iceman appears in the "Sub-Mariner" segment of The Marvel Super Heroes, voiced by Tom Harvey.
 Iceman appears in Spider-Man and His Amazing Friends, voiced by Frank Welker. This version is a founding member of the Spider-Friends, former member of the X-Men, and a government agent codenamed "Windchill Factor Zero".
 Iceman appears in X-Men: The Animated Series, voiced by Denis Akiyama. This version is a former member of the X-Men who quit due to disagreements with Charles Xavier and was previously in a relationship with Polaris.
 Iceman appears in X-Men: Evolution, voiced by Andrew Francis. This version is the unofficial leader of the X-Men's junior team, the New Mutants.
 Iceman appears in Wolverine and the X-Men, voiced by Yuri Lowenthal. This version is a member of the X-Men.
 Iceman appears in The Super Hero Squad Show, voiced by Shawn Ashmore. This version is the Xavier Academy's class clown.
 Iceman appears in Marvel Disk Wars: The Avengers, voiced by Yuki Tai in the Japanese version and again by Yuri Lowenthal in the English version. This version is a member of the X-Men.

Film

Iceman appears in 20th Century Fox's X-Men film series, portrayed by Shawn Ashmore. This version is a student at the Xavier Institute.
 First appearing in X-Men, he is one of the first students to befriend Rogue, who he enters a relationship with.
 In X2, he displays an uneasy friendship with classmate Pyro, who goes on to join Magneto's Brotherhood, and a strained relationship with his family, with his brother turning him into the police for being a mutant.
 In X-Men: The Last Stand, Iceman's relationship with Rogue deteriorates due in part to involvement from their classmate Kitty Pryde. He later battles and defeats Pyro in combat while protecting a facility in Alcatraz that had created a "mutant cure".
 In a dystopian future depicted in X-Men: Days of Future Past, Iceman's powers have grown stronger, though he is killed by a Sentinel. In the "Rogue Cut" of this scene, he is killed while helping Rogue and Magneto escape. After Wolverine changes the timeline and averts the dystopian future in both versions of the film, Iceman's relationship with Rogue is restored.

Video games
 Iceman appears as a bonus level boss in Fantastic Four.
 Iceman appears as a playable character in X-Men: Children of the Atom, voiced by Cathal Dodd.
 Iceman appears in Marvel vs. Capcom 2: New Age of Heroes.
 Iceman appears as a support character in Marvel vs. Capcom: Clash of Super Heroes.
 Iceman appears as a playable character in X-Men Legends, voiced by Darren Scott.
 Iceman appears as a playable character in X-Men Legends II: Rise of Apocalypse, voiced by James Arnold Taylor.
 Iceman appears as a playable character in Marvel: Ultimate Alliance, voiced again by James Arnold Taylor. Additionally, his Age of Apocalypse, classic suit, original comics suit, and New X-Men design appear as alternate costumes.
 Iceman appears as a playable character in X-Men: The Official Game, voiced again by Shawn Ashmore.
 Iceman appears as a playable character in Marvel: Ultimate Alliance 2, voiced by Adam Bobrow.
 Iceman appears in Magneto's ending in Marvel vs. Capcom 3: Fate of Two Worlds.
 Iceman appears as a playable character in Marvel Super Hero Squad Online, voiced by Antony Del Rio.
 Iceman appears in X-Men: Destiny, voiced by Jason Marsden.
 Iceman appears as a playable character in Marvel Avengers: Battle for Earth.
 Iceman appears as a playable character in Marvel: Avengers Alliance.
 Iceman appears as a playable character in Lego Marvel Super Heroes.
 Iceman appears as a playable character in Marvel Contest of Champions.
 Two incarnations of Iceman appear as playable characters in Marvel Puzzle Quest.
 Iceman appears as a playable character in Marvel Heroes, voiced by James Arnold Taylor.
 Iceman appears as a playable character in Marvel Powers United VR, voiced by James Arnold Taylor.
 Iceman appears as a downloadable playable character in Marvel: Ultimate Alliance 3, voiced again by James Arnold Taylor.
 Iceman appears as a playable character in Marvel Super War.

Miscellaneous
 Iceman appears in the 1987 live adaptation of  Spider-Man's wedding to Mary Jane.
 Iceman appears in the novelization for X-Men: The Last Stand, in which he saves Pyro from Phoenix's destruction.

Collected editions

References

External links
 Iceman at Marvel.com

1984 comics debuts
2001 comics debuts
Characters created by Jack Kirby
Characters created by Stan Lee
Comics characters introduced in 1963
Fictional accountants
Fictional American Jews in comics
Fictional characters from New York (state)
Fictional characters with ice or cold abilities
Fictional characters with water abilities
Fictional characters with elemental transmutation abilities
Fictional gay males
Jewish superheroes
Male characters in film
Marvel Comics characters who are shapeshifters
Marvel Comics American superheroes
Marvel Comics film characters
Marvel Comics LGBT superheroes
Marvel Comics male superheroes
Marvel Comics martial artists
Marvel Comics mutants
Superhero schoolteachers
Teenage characters in comics
X-Factor (comics)
X-Men members